Gosforth is a suburb of the city of Newcastle upon Tyne, Tyne and Wear, England. 

Gosforth may also refer to:

United Kingdom

Gosforth, Tyne and Wear
Gosforth Urban District, extant from 1895 to 1974
Education:
Gosforth Academy, formerly known as/created from Gosforth Grammar School, Gosforth County Secondary School, Gosforth East County Secondary School and Gosforth High School
Gosforth Middle Schools
Sport
Gosforth Greyhound Stadium (former, 1932–1988)
Gosforth Rugby Football Club
Newcastle Falcons, previously known as Gosforth Rugby Club and Newcastle Gosforth

Others
Gosforth, Cumbria, village, civil parish and electoral ward in Cumbria, England
Dronfield Henry Fanshawe School, created from The Gosforth Secondary Modern School, Derbyshire

Australia
Gosforth, New South Wales, situated in City of Maitland, Hunter Region

Other uses
Gosforth (ship), 19th-century timber ship built in North Shields, England

See also
Peter Taylor, Baron Taylor of Gosforth (1930–1997), Lord Chief Justice of England